The Second Coming is a novel by Walker Percy.  It is a sequel to The Last Gentleman.  It tells the story of middle-aged Will Barrett and his relationship with Allison, a young woman who has escaped from a mental hospital. The book was nominated for the National Book Critics Circle Award in 1980.

The novel spends much of its content in unspoken but printed dialog of Will Barrett (the principal character) with himself and/or people he has dealt with in his past.  He talks his way through his memories and realizes he is a character who suffers from the affliction that his father had: the belief that life – as most people (including him) live it – is worse than death.  His father's solution was to kill himself (as did Percy's own father and grandfather), but his father also opted to try to kill him  (Will), in order to save him from the life of despair that his father knows will befall him.  He reflects on these occurrences throughout the book.

Barrett decides he will put God to the test.  He will enter a cave near his home in North Carolina, telling no one what he is doing but leaving notes in case he does not return, and take barbiturates until God proves His existence and love by saving him, or he dies, thus demonstrating God does not exist.  After a literal dark night of the soul at the end of which he is brought out of his drugged stupor by shooting pain from an abscessed tooth, he is figuratively reborn, falling out of the cavern and into the care of a woman who is a refugee from an insane asylum. Whereas he cannot escape the past, she can only live in the present, bereft of memory by prior electroshock therapy. Two maimed and incomplete people come together and somehow make each other whole, and Will Barrett is, however briefly, redeemed through love of and with another. The book represents a remarkable depiction of the human struggle with faith.

This work contains Percy's musings on "ravening particles," a reference to the alienation and anomie the individual feels from both within and without in the absence of faith.

References

1980 American novels
1980 science fiction novels
Novels by Walker Percy
Catholic novels
Novels set in North Carolina
Farrar, Straus and Giroux books
PEN/Faulkner Award for Fiction-winning works